René Francisco Brassea Valenzuela (born 7 October 1989) is a Mexican professional gridiron football offensive lineman for the Dinos de Saltillo of the Liga de Fútbol Americano Profesional (LFA). He played college football at UDLAP.

College career
Born in Hermosillo, Sonora, Brassea played college football for UDLAP from 2009 to 2014, winning three national championships with the team (2010, 2013 and 2014).

Professional career
Brassea joined the Fundidores Monterrey of the Professional American Football League of Mexico for the 2019 after trying luck in some American arena football teams.

In January 2019, Brassea was picked by the Saskatchewan Roughriders of the Canadian Football League at the first round of the CFL–LFA Draft. During the 2019 CFL season, Brassea played in 17 games, plus the Western final in the playoffs; the 2020 season was cancelled due to the COVID-19 pandemic. He signed a contract extension with the team on January 6, 2021. He was released on June 21, 2021.

International career
In 2016, Brassea was selected to represent his country at the 2016 World University American Football Championship, where Mexico won a gold medal.

References

Living people
1989 births
Sportspeople from Hermosillo
Mexican players of American football
Mexican players of Canadian football
American football offensive linemen
Fundidores de Monterrey players
Dinos de Saltillo players
Saskatchewan Roughriders players
Mexican expatriate sportspeople in Canada
Canadian football offensive linemen
Aztecas UDLAP players